Cees Schapendonk (born 24 December 1955 in Den Bosch, North Brabant) is a former football striker from the Netherlands. In his sole appearance for the Netherlands national football team on 22 February 1981, he scored in a three-nil victory over Cyprus.

At club level, Schapendonk played for FC Eindhoven and scored fifty goals for the team (including the 1250th in the history of Dutch professional football against Telstar). In a career which spanned over 550 matches in the Dutch league, he also played for MVV Maastricht, AA Gent, Excelsior Rotterdam, RKC Waalwijk and NAC Breda.

External links

1955 births
Living people
Dutch footballers
Dutch expatriate footballers
Netherlands international footballers
Association football forwards
RKC Waalwijk players
MVV Maastricht players
FC Eindhoven players
Excelsior Rotterdam players
Eerste Divisie players
Eredivisie players
Belgian Pro League players
NAC Breda players
K.A.A. Gent players
Expatriate footballers in Belgium
Dutch expatriate sportspeople in Belgium
Sportspeople from 's-Hertogenbosch
Footballers from North Brabant